DYTH (990 AM) is a relay station of DZRH, owned and operated by Manila Broadcasting Company through its licensee Pacific Broadcasting System. The station's transmitter is located along PNP Rd. cor. Maharlika Highway, Brgy. Campetic, Palo, Leyte shared tower with Aksyon Radyo Tacloban 819.

References

External links
DZRH FB Page
DZRH Website

Pacific Broadcasting Systems stations
Radio stations in Tacloban
DZRH Nationwide stations
Radio stations established in 1986